Choiromyces meandriformis is a species of fungus belonging to the family Tuberaceae.

It is native to Europe.

References

Pezizales